Carmenta odda is a moth of the family Sesiidae. It was described by W. Donald Duckworth and Thomas Drake Eichlin in 1977. It is found in the United States from South Carolina to Florida.

References

External links
Moth Photographers Group. Mississippi State University.

Sesiidae
Moths described in 1977